Can't Wait Another Day is an album by the Brooklyn indie pop band The Ladybug Transistor, and the last with the drummer San Fadyl. It was released on June 5, 2007, by Merge Records.

Critical reception
Exclaim! wrote that "this is far from a bad album--in fact, it's pretty good--it's just somewhat disappointing to see the band shrink away from the unabashed joyfulness they once made their own." The Guardian wrote that "long-term fans will envelop themselves happily in the album's soft loveliness, despite a feeling that some more memorable moments would have been welcome."

Track listing
 "Always on the Telephone"
 "I'm Not Mad Enough"
 "Here Comes the Rain"
 "Terry"
 "This Old Chase"
 "For No Other"
 "Three Days from Now"
 "In-Between"
 "So Blind"
 "Broken Links"
 "California Stopover"
 "Lord, Don't Pass Me By"

Personnel 
 Gary Olson - vocals, guitar and trumpet
 Jeff Baron - guitar
 Ben Crum - guitar
 San Fadyl - drums
 Kyle Forester - piano, organ and backing vocals
 Julia Rydholm - bass guitar and backing vocals

References

2007 albums
The Ladybug Transistor albums
Merge Records albums